Lone Tree Cemetery may refer to:

 Lone Tree Commonwealth War Graves Commission Cemetery, Ypres, Belgium
 Lone Tree Cemetery, Fairview, California